Trap Street is a 2013 Chinese film written and directed by debut Chinese film director Vivian Qu and starring Lu Yulai and He Wenchao. It premiered at the 2013 Venice International Film Festival, where it was nominated for the prestigious Luigi De Laurentiis Award. It subsequently won the Dragons and Tigers Award - Special Mention and second place in the Award itself at the Vancouver International Film Festival in the same year, and the Grand Jury Prize at the Boston Independent Film Festival in early 2014.

The film tells the story of a young digital map-making surveyor, working for a digital mapping company, who in his spare time helps install CCTV cameras. He becomes infatuated with a young woman who works at a mysterious building in a street he has recently mapped. After establishing what appears to be a growing friendship, he loses contact with her. Determined to find her by using his computing and electronic skills, he discovers that the street has mysteriously disappeared from the electronic record, and the CCTV images of it are not accessible.

Plot
Trap Street tells the story of a young digital map-making surveyor, Li Qiuming, who works for a digital mapping company in a city in Southern China. During his spare time, he makes a little extra money by helping private clients to install CCTV cameras in places he has identified on his maps. One day, he finds an attractive young woman, and deciding to pluck up the courage to meet her, he tells her about his hobbies and the nature of his job. Her name is Guan Lifen. She seems to be uninterested in him, but he persists, and soon becomes infatuated with her. He offers her a lift home in his car, but after he has dropped her off, notices a small box with a memory stick inside it. He resolves to return it to her as soon as he can and arranges to meet her at a local cafe. However, Guan does not turn up, and a man arrives instead to collect the memory stick, asking Li for his home address so that he can thank him properly.

While looking for Guan, Li discovers her in an unlabelled street: it is called Forest Lane, and he sees Guan entering a mysterious building in it, known as Lab 23. He meets her and she now seems more interested in him. During a subsequent meeting, Li gives her the present of a satellite navigation device for her car, which impresses her, and they seem to become friends.

Losing contact with Guan, and unable to find her, Li decides to try tracking her down using the digital map he has created, and by accessing the video images off one of the CCTV cameras he has set up nearby. He is then shocked to discover that the street has disappeared from his map, and the video from the CCTV camera is unobtainable. On their next meeting, in a bar, some weeks later, Guan seems reluctant to talk to him, much as on their first meeting, and uninterested in the many efforts he has made to locate her. The mood darkens, and Li himself then disappears from the bar.

Production
Trap Street was filmed in the city of Nanjing in central East-coast China, and marks the directorial debut of female Chinese film-maker Vivian Qu, a former film producer, who also wrote the screenplay. The film stars the Sichuan-born Chinese film scriptwriter and actor, Lu Yulai, and Chinese film director and actress, He Wenchao. The film has not yet been released in mainland China, as it must first be reviewed by China's State Administration of Press, Publication, Radio, Film and Television, the Chinese film industry's governing body. It has, however, been screened in Hong Kong (since 1997 a Special Autonomous Region of China), at the Hong Kong International Film Festival, and at many film festivals around the world.

The film takes its name from a trap street, a false street deliberately entered on a map by publishing houses in order to 'trap' anyone attempting to break copyright by selling copies of it while passing it off as their own work. The film's title inverts the meaning, becoming a real street which is deliberately obscured or removed from a map - and anyone who attempts to identify it by placing it on public record is then 'trapped'. GPS technology would supposedly uncover the existence of any such street, but the film's central message is that more powerful forces are able to shape both the technology and the public to "reflect the reality they wish to put across". The film was partly financed through a grant from the Swiss film fund Visions Sud Est.

Cast
 Lu Yulai ... Li Qiuming
 He Wenchao ... Guan Lifen
 Yong Hou ... Zhang Sheng
 Zhao Xiaofei ... Qiuming's Father
 Liu Tiejian ... Bo Xie
 Li Xinghong ... Interrogator

Reception 
Trap Street enjoyed success at international film festivals across the world from an early stage. After receiving a nomination for the Luigi De Laurentiis Award at Venice on its world premiere on 1 September 2013, it went on to become an official selection of the 2013 Toronto International Film Festival on 6 September, where it was nominated for the Discovery Award.

At the Vancouver International Film Festival on 1 October, Trap Street won the Dragons and Tigers Award - Special Mention, as well as second place in the Dragons and Tigers Award. It was subsequently nominated for awards at many other festivals and won the Grand Jury Prize at the Boston Independent Film Festival on 24 April 2014. It is due for theatrical release across France, beginning on 18 June 2014.

Festival screenings, nominations and awards
 2013 Venice International Film Festival, Italy
 Luigi De Laurentiis Award (nomination)
 1 September 2013
 2013 Toronto International Film Festival, Canada
 Discovery Award (nomination)
 6 September 2013
 2013 Vancouver International Film Festival, Canada
 Dragon and Tigers Award - Special Mention
 Dragon and Tigers Award - 2nd place
 1 October 2013
 2Morrow Film Festival, Russia
 4 October 2013
 Warsaw International Film Festival, Poland
 Grand Prize (nomination)
 11 October 2013
 BFI London Film Festival, United Kingdom
 Sutherland Trophy (nomination)
 16 October 2013
 Stockholm International Film Festival, Sweden
 11 November 2013
 Tallinn Black Nights Festival, Estonia
 Grand Prize (nomination)
 26 November 2013
 Kerala International Film Festival, India
 9 December 2013
 Rotterdam International Film Festival, the Netherlands
 Lions Film Award (nomination)
 23 January 2014
 Portland International Film Festival, USA
 8 February 2014
 Jameson Dublin International Film Festival, Ireland
 21 February 2014
 Miami International Film Festival, USA
 10 March 2014
 Sofia International Film Festival, Bulgaria
 Grand Prize (nomination)
 11 March 2014
 The Big Picture Film Festival, Australia
 21 March 2014
 Hong Kong International Film Festival, Hong Kong S.A.R., China
 26 March 2014
 Cleveland International Film Festival, USA
 27 March 2014
 New Directors/New Films Festival, USA
 28 March 2014
 National Museum of Singapore, Singapore
 5 April 2014
 Nashville Film Festival, USA
 Best of Festival (nomination)
 19 April 2014
 Boston Independent Film Festival, USA
 Grand Jury Prize
 24 April 2014
 MOOOV Filmfestival, Belgium
 26 April 2014
 San Francisco International Film Festival, USA
 New Directors Prize (nomination)
 26 April 2014
 Kosmorama International Film Festival, Norway
 28 April 2014
 Theatrical distribution across France
 18 June 2014

See also
 List of Chinese films of 2013

References

External links 
 
 Mini-Review: Trap Street (2013) at TheDullWoodExperiment.com

2013 thriller drama films
2013 films
Chinese independent films
Chinese mystery films
Chinese thriller films
Films set in China
Films set in Jiangsu
Films set in Nanjing
2010s Mandarin-language films
2013 directorial debut films
2013 drama films
2013 independent films